Stroitel (lit. builder) is a town and the administrative center of Yakovlevsky District in Belgorod Oblast, Russia, located near the Vorskla River (an arm of the Dnieper),  from Belgorod, the administrative center of the oblast. Population:

History
Stroitel was founded in 1958 due to the then-planned construction of the Yakovlevsky mine. It was granted urban-type settlement status in 1960 and town status in 2000.

Administrative and municipal status
Within the framework of administrative divisions, Stroitel serves as the administrative center of Yakovlevsky District, to which it is directly subordinated. As a municipal division, the town of Stroitel, together with three rural localities in Yakovlevsky District, is incorporated within Yakovlevsky Municipal District as Stroitel Urban Settlement.

References

Notes

Sources

Cities and towns in Belgorod Oblast
Populated places in Yakovlevsky District, Belgorod Oblast